Club Deportivo Santanyí is a football team based in Santanyí in the autonomous community of Balearic Islands. Founded in 1968, it plays in the Tercera División - Group 11. Its stadium is Estadi Municipal de Santanyí with a capacity of 4,000 seats.

History

Club Deportivo Santanyí was founded in 1968. The 2007-08 season it was able to play for promotion to the Segunda División B, but it lost the first tie against CD Mirandés by an overall result of 3-0.

Season to season

27 seasons in Tercera División

References

External links
Futbolme team profile 
CD Santanyí on FFIB.es 

Football clubs in the Balearic Islands
Sport in Mallorca
Association football clubs established in 1968
Santanyí
1968 establishments in Spain